Ian Potter (born 6 August 1958) is an English former professional rugby league footballer who played in the 1970s and 1980s.

Background
Ian Potter was born in St. Helens, Lancashire, England.

Playing career

International honours
Potter won caps for England while at Warrington in 1981 against France, and Wales, played  in Great Britain's 7–8 defeat by France in the friendly at Stadio Pier Luigi Penzo, Venice on Saturday 31 July 1982, and won caps for Great Britain while at Wigan in 1985 against New Zealand (3 matches), and in 1986 against France (2 matches), Australia (2 matches), and Australia (interchange/substitute).

Premiership Final appearances
Potter played right-, i.e. number 12, in Wigan's 8–0 victory over Warrington in the Premiership Final during the 1986–87 season at Old Trafford, Manchester on Sunday 17 May 1987.

Championship appearances
Potter played in Wigan's victory in the Championship during the 1986–87 season.

World Club Challenge appearances
Potter played right-, i.e. number 12, in Wigan's 8–2 victory over Manly-Warringah Sea Eagles in the 1987 World Club Challenge at Central Park, Wigan on Wednesday 7 October 1987.

Challenge Cup Final appearances
Potter played  in Wigan's 28–24 victory over Hull F.C. in the 1985 Challenge Cup Final during the 1984–85 season at Wembley Stadium, London on Saturday 4 May 1985, played right-, i.e. number 12, in the 32–12 victory over Halifax in the 1988 Challenge Cup Final during the 1987–88 season at Wembley Stadium, London on Saturday 30 April 1988, and played right- in the 27–0 victory over St. Helens, and in the 1989 Challenge Cup Final during the 1988–89 season at Wembley Stadium, London on Saturday 29 April 1989.

County Cup Final appearances
Potter played as an interchange/substitute, i.e. number 15, (replacing  Bob Eccles) in Warrington's 26–10 victory over Wigan in the 1980 Lancashire County Cup Final during the 1980–81 season at Knowsley Road, St. Helens, on Saturday 4 October 1980, played  in Wigan's 18–26 defeat by St. Helens in the 1984 Lancashire County Cup Final during the 1984–85 season at Central Park, Wigan on Sunday 28 October 1984, played  in the 34–8 victory over Warrington in the 1985 Lancashire County Cup Final during the 1985–86 season at Knowsley Road, St. Helens, on Sunday 13 October 1985, played right-, i.e. number 12, in the 15–8 victory over Oldham in the 1986 Lancashire County Cup Final during the 1986–87 season at Knowsley Road, St. Helens, on Sunday 19 October 1986, and played right- in the 28–16 victory over Warrington in the 1987 Lancashire County Cup Final during the 1987–88 season at Knowsley Road, St. Helens, on Sunday 11 October 1987.

Players No.6/John Player/John Player Special Trophy Final appearances
Potter played  in Warrington's 9–4 victory over Widnes in the 1977–78 Players No.6 Trophy Final during the 1977–78 season at Knowsley Road, St. Helens on Saturday 28 January 1978, played right-, i.e. number 12, in the 12–5 victory over Barrow in the 1980–81 John Player Trophy Final during the 1980–81 season at Central Park, Wigan on Saturday 24 January 1981, played  in Wigan's 18–4 victory over Hull Kingston Rovers in the 1985–86 John Player Special Trophy Final during the 1985–86 season at Elland Road, Leeds on Saturday 11 January 1986, played right- in the 18–4 victory over Warrington in the 1986–87 John Player Special Trophy Final during the 1986–87 season at Burnden Park, Bolton on Saturday 10 January 1987, and played right- in the 12–6 victory over Widnes in the 1988–89 John Player Special Trophy Final during the 1988–89 season at Burnden Park, Bolton on Saturday 7 January 1989.

Notable tour matches
Potter played  in Warrington's 15–12 victory over Australia at Wilderspool Stadium, Warrington on Wednesday 11 October 1978, and played  in Wigan's 14–8 victory over New Zealand during the 1985 New Zealand rugby league tour of Great Britain and France at Central Park, Wigan on Sunday 6 October 1985.

Club career
Ian Potter made his début for Warrington on Sunday 30 November 1975, and he played his last match for Warrington on Sunday 20 September 1981.

References

External links
Statistics at wigan.rlfans.com
Statistics at wolvesplayers.thisiswarrington.co.uk

1958 births
Living people
England national rugby league team players
English rugby league players
Great Britain national rugby league team players
Lancashire rugby league team players
Leigh Leopards players
Rugby league locks
Rugby league players from St Helens, Merseyside
Rugby league second-rows
Warrington Wolves players
Wigan Warriors players